Dandaragan is a small town in the Wheatbelt region of Western Australia. The name of Dandaragan was first recorded in 1850 as the name of a nearby gulley and spring or watering hole known as Dandaraga spring. The word is Indigenous Australian in origin and is thought to mean good kangaroo country.

The first recorded land lease was to William Brockman in 1848; he had a  land lease at Muchamulla Springs.
James Drummond settled in the area in 1850 and established a farm. A police station was built later and the townsite was gazetted in 1958.

The Dandaragan plateau is the underlying geological feature of the area the town is located.

Select Harvests unsuccessfully attempted to grow a large almond orchard near Dandaragan between 2010 and 2015.

References

External links 

Shire of Dandaragan